The 1981 British Speedway Championship was the 21st edition of the British Speedway Championship. The Final took place on 3 June at Brandon in Coventry, England. The Championship was won by Steve Bastable, who beat Kenny Carter and John Louis in a run-off for the title. The top eight riders qualified for the next stage of the World Championship, the 1981 Overseas Final.

Final 
3 June 1981
 Brandon Stadium, Coventry

See also 
 British Speedway Championship
 1981 Individual Speedway World Championship

References 

British Speedway Championship
Great Britain